Anna Peyre Dinnies (Shackleford; pen name, Moina; February 7, 1805 - August 8, 1886) was a 19th-century American poet and miscellaneous writer. Under the pen name of "Moina", both before and after her marriage, she wrote many poems which attracted attention, of which "Chrysanthemum" was one of the better-known. She contributed to the leading periodicals of the South.

Early life and education
Anna (or "Anne") Peyre Shackleford was born in Georgetown, South Carolina, February 7, 1805. She was one of the several daughters of Judge W. F. Shackleford.

The family moved to Charleston, South Carolina when Anna was a child. She was educated in that city, in a seminary kept by the daughters of Dr. David Ramsay, the author and historian.

Career
Anna corresponded for four year with John C. Dinnies, a popular bookseller of St. Louis, Missouri, before they met, and a week later, married in 1830. Mr. Dinnies and Mr. Radford were the publishers of The St. Louis Medical and Surgical Journal, a monthly.

In 1845, or 1849, Mr. and Mrs. Dinnies removed from St. Louis for New Orleans. In 1847, Mrs. Dinnies published, The Floral Year, Embellished with Bouquets of Flowers, Drawn and Colored from Nature. Each Flower illustrated with a Poem. By Mrs. Anna Peyre Dinnies. Boston: Benjamin B. Mussy, Publisher, 1847. The book contains two hundred and fifty-six pages, illustrated by thirteen full-page colored plates. It was what was called in its day a gift book.

Mrs. Dinnies lost her only child, a daughter, in 1853 and a few years later on, adopted a little girl, who became Mrs. Louis Grunewald of New Orleans. In New Orleans, John Clifford Dinnies engaged in journalism: he wrote special articles for some of the daily newspapers, and for several years edited The Price Current. On account of an editorial, General Benjamin Butler suspended The Price Current during the civil war and had Mr. Dinnies imprisoned.

She published many poems in various magazines under the pen-name of "Moina". Among her best poems are "The Wife", "Wedded Love", "Love's Messenger", "Carolina", a patriotic war-lyric, and "The Greek Skave", an imaginative interpretation of Powers' famous statue. As to the controversy over the authorship of "The Conquered Banner", Mrs. Dinnies, in the 1830s, adopted the pen name of "Moina", using it for contributions to The Illinois Monthly Magazine, Vandalia and Bloomington, Illinois. This name she used ever afterwards. In the 1860s, Father Abram J. Ryan also used the same pseudonym, unaware of Mrs. Dinnies' prior claim to it. "The Conquered Banner" was published under the signature, "Moina”. The correspondence that took place between Mrs. Dinnies and Father Ryan was as to the use of the name "Moina” — not as to the authorship of "The Conquered Banner". Mrs. Dinnies never claimed the poem and Father Ryan graciously apologized and never after used the signature, "Moina".

Death
Mr. Dinnies died in 1882. Mrs. Dinnies died in New Orleans, Louisiana, August 8, 1886.

Selected works

Books
 The Floral Year, Embellished with Bouquets of Flowers, Drawn and Colored from Nature. Each Flower illustrated with a Poem. By Mrs. Anna Peyre Dinnies. Boston: Benjamin B. Mussy, Publisher, 1847.

Poems
 "The Wife"
"Wedded Love"
 "Love's Messenger"
 "Carolina"
 "The Greek Skave"
 "The Conquered Banner"

References

Attribution
 
 
 
 
 
 
 

1805 births
1886 deaths
19th-century American poets
19th-century American women writers
People from Georgetown, South Carolina
Pseudonymous women writers
19th-century pseudonymous writers